Neyt may refer to:

People 
 Adolphe Neyt (1830–1892), Belgian industrialist, amateur photographer, and weapons collector
 Bernard Neyt (1825–1880), Belgian painter
 Georges Neyt (1842–1910), Belgian diplomat
 Herman de Neyt (1588–1642), Flemish Baroque painter and art dealer
 Pieter Johannes Neyt (1839–1900), Dutch engineer

Places 
 Neyt Point, a point in the Palmer Archipelago, Antarctica

See also 
 Annemie Neyts (born 1944), Belgian politician